Influences is the debut solo album by English musician Mark King, singer and bass player with Level 42. It was released by Polydor Records in July 1984.

The album features a cover of the song "I Feel Free" by Cream, which was released as a single. King played most of the instruments on the album. Guest musicians include Level 42 keyboardist Mike Lindup and Drummie Zeb from Aswad, the latter of whom played drums on "Clocks Go Forward".

The album charted at No.77 in the UK.

Track listing
 "The Essential" (Mark King) – 18:32
 "Clocks Go Forward" (Mark King, R.Gould) – 5:20
 "I Feel Free" (Jack Bruce, Pete Brown) – 4:37
 "Pictures On The Wall" (Mark King, R.Gould) – 4:51
 "There is a Dog" (Mark King) – 6:26

Personnel
Mark King – vocals, basses, guitar, keyboards, percussion and drums
Mike Lindup – Fender Rhodes, Yamaha DX7 and backing vocals
Gary Barnacle – electric sax, saxophone and flute
Steve Sidwell – trumpet
Adrian Lee – Wave PPG synthesiser
Drummie – drums on "Clocks Go Forward"
Bruce Dukov – violins
Francis Mitchell – cello
Mike Vernon, Jeremy Green and Linda Richardson – the choir on "The Essential"

References

1984 debut albums
Mark King (musician) albums
Polydor Records albums